Melele FC is a Lesotho football club based in Qacha's Nek. It is based in the city of Qacha's Nek in the Qacha's Nek District.

The team currently plays in Lesotho Premier League.

Stadium
Currently the team plays at the 1000 capacity Qacha's Nek Stadium.

References

External links
Soccerway

Football clubs in Lesotho